Lipe Farm is a historic home and farm complex located at Newark Valley in Tioga County, New York. The house was built about 1872 and consists of three principal sections: a 2-story front-gabled wing, a -story side gable, and a long 1-story rear addition.  Also on the property are a cow barn, wagon house, garage, tractor shed, granary, hen house, silo and stone wall.

It was listed on the National Register of Historic Places in 1998.

References

Houses on the National Register of Historic Places in New York (state)
Houses completed in 1872
Houses in Tioga County, New York
National Register of Historic Places in Tioga County, New York